HD 172991, also known as HR 7031 or rarely 20 G. Coronae Australis, is a binary star located in the southern constellation Corona Australis. It has a combined apparent magnitude of 5.44, making it faintly visible to the naked eye. At its current distance HD 172991's brightness is diminished by magnitudes due to interstellar dust and it has an absolute magnitude of −2.56.

HD 172991 has a stellar classification of K1/2 III, indicating that it is an evolved red giant. The companion, HD 172992, is a B-type star with a stellar classification of B9/A1 V.  Although the two components can be resolved in the spectrum, they cannot be observed in telescopes, making observation difficult.

HD 172991 has 4.98 times the mass of the Sun but it has expanded to 53.9 times the Sun's radius.

References

K-type giants
B-type main-sequence stars
Binary stars
Corona Australis
Coronae Australis, 20
CD-39 12864
172991/172992
091989
7031